Alicia Wilson may refer to:
 Alicia Wilson (footballer)
 Alicia Wilson (swimmer)